The Corrymeela Community was founded in 1965 by Ray Davey, along with John Morrow and Alex Watson, as an organisation seeking to aid individuals and communities which suffered through the violence and polarisation of the Northern Irish conflict.

Early members were Christians in  Northern Ireland from diverse backgrounds who wanted to begin a new community which could counter apathy and complacency and open up new possibilities.

In early 1965, to give the community a physical gathering place, Corrymeela moved to the Holiday Fellowship Centre near Ballycastle in County Antrim.  The new centre was formally opened that same year by Pastor Tullio Vinay, founder of the Agape Community, which was one of Ray Davey's greatest inspirations.

Its structure formalised, and a council was elected with Davey serving as treasurer and secretary.  Corrymeela opened for the public in November 1965, opening itself as a place for Christian reconciliation in Northern Ireland.

Corrymeela was awarded the Niwano Peace Prize in 1997, in honour of "its contribution to significantly to interreligious cooperation, thereby furthering the cause of world peace."

Programme work

The community also exhibits artwork with themes of peace and reconciliation for Northern Ireland.  In 2007, it exhibited The Linen Memorial, a piece made from almost 400 Irish linen handkerchiefs listing almost 4000 names of those killed in the Northern Irish conflict.  Visitors left mementos and tokens beside names of those killed, making it an interactive and evolving artwork.

The community also hosts educational programmes at the Corrymeela Ballycastle Centre for groups of students and faculty members visiting from colleges and universities around the world.

Leaders

Ray Davey 1965 – 1980
John Morrow 1980 – 1994
Trevor Williams 1994 – 2003
David Stevens 2003 – 2010
 Kate Pettis 2010–2011 
Inderjit Bhogal 2011 – 2013
Pádraig Ó Tuama 2014–2019
 Alexander Wimberly 2019–present

Volunteers
 Shaunagh Craig, Northern Ireland netball international

See also
Reconciliation theology in Northern Ireland

References

External links

Youth as Evaluators: Contested Spaces and Identity Short film of interviews with young people at the Corrymeela Centre

Charities based in Northern Ireland
The Troubles (Northern Ireland)
Christian nonviolence
Ballycastle, County Antrim
1965 establishments in Northern Ireland